Polymyxin B, sold under the brand name Poly-Rx among others, is an antibiotic used to treat meningitis, pneumonia, sepsis, and urinary tract infections. While it is useful for many Gram negative infections, it is not useful for Gram positive infections. It can be given by injection into a vein, muscle, or cerebrospinal fluid or inhaled. The injectable form is generally only used if other options are not available. It is also available as the combinations bacitracin/polymyxin B and neomycin/polymyxin B/bacitracin for use on the skin.

Common side effects when given by injection include kidney problems, neurological problems, fever, itchiness, and rash. Injections into muscle may result in significant pain. Other serious side effects may include fungal infections, anaphylaxis, and muscle weakness. It is unclear if use during pregnancy is safe for the baby. Polymyxin B works by breaking down the cytoplasmic membrane which generally results in bacterial cell death.

Polymyxin B was approved for medical use in the United States in 1964. It is on the World Health Organization's List of Essential Medicines. It is available as a generic medication. In Europe it is only approved to be applied to the skin as of 2015. It is derived from the bacterium Paenibacillus polymyxa (formerly known as Bacillus polymyxa).

Medical uses

Spectrum of susceptibility
Polymyxin B has been used to treat urinary tract infections and meningitis caused by Pseudomonas aeruginosa and Haemophilus influenzae, respectively. The following represents MIC susceptibility data for a few medically significant microorganisms.
 Haemophilus influenzae: ≥0.8 μg/ml
 Pseudomonas aeruginosa: 0.25 μg/ml – 1 μg/ml

Endotoxin adsorption 

An effective use of polymyxin B is found in patients with refractory septic shock, that is, without positive outcome to the administration of standard treatments (increase in volemia and other antibiotics). The obstacle of the toxicity of polymyxin B is bypassed by extracorporeal circulation with perfusion of venous blood through a cartridge on whose fibers polymyxin B is covalently fixed; in this way the antibiotic exerts its bactericidal function but is not released into the blood since it remains fully attached to the fiber. Through this perfusion the cartridge retains the endotoxin, recognized as the trigger of septic shock. The treatment of the cartridge to polymyxin B (Toraymyxin, medical device designed and produced by the Japanese Toray), takes place in two sessions of two hours each, carried out at a distance of 24 hours.

Mechanism of action 
Alters bacterial outer membrane permeability by binding to a negatively charged site in the lipopolysaccharide layer, which has an electrostatic attraction for the positively charged amino groups in the cyclic peptide portion  (this site normally is a binding site for calcium and magnesium counter ions); the result is a destabilized outer membrane
Fatty acid portion dissolves in hydrophobic region of cytoplasmic membrane and disrupts membrane integrity
Leakage of cellular molecules, inhibition of cellular respiration
Binds and inactivates endotoxin
Relative absence of selective toxicity: nonspecific for cell membranes of any type, highly toxic.

Removal of the hydrophobic tail of polymyxin B yields polymyxin nonapeptide (PMBN), which still binds to LPS, but no longer kills the bacterial cell. However, it still detectably increases the permeability of the bacterial cell wall to other antibiotics, indicating that it still causes some degree of membrane disorganization.

Mixture composition 
Polymyxin B is composed of polymyxins B1, B1-I, B2, B3, and B6. Polymyxins B1 and B2 are considered major components. These related components are structurally identical with the exception of a variable fatty acid group on each fraction. Results from in vitro studies have shown marginal differences in MIC data when comparing the fractions.

Research application 
Polymyxin B is also used to induce envelope stress in order to study the organisms response to such stress. Polymyxin envelope stress assays such as this have been used for the study of small RNA (sRNA) responses in Salmonella enterica.

See also 
 Polymyxin

References

External links
 

Polymyxin antibiotics
Otologicals
Cyclic peptides
Polypeptide antibiotics
Wikipedia medicine articles ready to translate